Dendropoma gregarium is a worm snail common in intertidal and subtidal areas in Hawaiʻi and the tropical Pacific.

References

 Bieler, R.; Petit, R. E. (2011). Catalogue of Recent and fossil “worm-snail” taxa of the families Vermetidae, Siliquariidae, and Turritellidae (Mollusca: Caenogastropoda). Zootaxa. 2948: 1-103
 Golding, R. E.; Bieler, R.; Rawlings, T. A.; Collins 2014, T. M. (2014). Deconstructing Dendropoma: a systematic revision of a world-wide worm-snail group with descriptions of new genera (Caenogastropoda: Vermetidae). Malacologia. 57(1): 1-97.

External links
 Hadfield, M. G. & Kay, E. A. In: Hadfield, M.G., Kay, E.A, Gillette, M.U. & Lloyd, M.C. (1972). The Vermetidae (Mollusca: Gastropoda) of the Hawaiian Islands. Marine Biology. 12(1): 81-98
 Bieler, R.; Petit, R. E. (2011). Catalogue of Recent and fossil “worm-snail” taxa of the families Vermetidae, Siliquariidae, and Turritellidae (Mollusca: Caenogastropoda). Zootaxa. 2948: 1-103

Vermetidae
Molluscs of the Pacific Ocean
Marine gastropods
Gastropods described in 1972